Justice Terry may refer to:

Charles L. Terry Jr., associate justice of the Delaware Supreme Court
David S. Terry, chief justice of the Supreme Court of California